Acharya Tulsi Regional Cancer Institute and Research Centre is a cancer research institute in Bikaner, Rajasthan, India. It is the 13th Regional Cancer Centre in India.

History
Establishment of RCC, Bikaner Treatment of cancer patients in Bikaner has a very old and distinguished history. Even earlier than 1940, in the whole North-West India, Bikaner was the only place to provide Radiation Therapy by the deep and superficial X-ray to cancer patients. In pre independent era, cancer treatment by Radium was made available here. The first Tele Cobalt-60 machine for treatment of cancer patients was commissioned in 1965. Thereby keeping pace with the developments in the treatment of cancer around the world, Bikaner had become one of the oldest and prime centres of treatment of cancer in North West part of India.

Overview

In the past fifteen years, the numbers of new and follow up patients have increased by about five times and thirteen times respectively. Since 1994, and afterwards, persistent efforts were made by public, philanthropic organizations, local administration and Government of Rajasthan, in order to get, S.P. Medical College & A.G. of Hospitals, Bikaner, recognized as a Regional Cancer Center (R.C.C.) Due to these efforts, the Government of India accorded the status of 13th Regional Cancer Centre to Sardar Patel Medical College, Bikaner on 19 July 1999. 

The Acharya Tulsi Regional Cancer Treatment and Research Institute (Regional Cancer Centre) Bikaner is the 13th Regional Cancer Centre in India, is situated at Bikaner (Rajasthan) and is a Registered Society under Rajasthan Society Registration Act. 1958 (Rajasthan Act. No. 28, 1958) w.e.f. 13 March 2000. The Registration No. issued by the Registrar, Co-operative Societies, Bikaner is 139/99-2000. The memorandum of Association as well as the rules and regulation of the institute duly drawn, approved and registered with the Registrar, Co-operative Societies, Bikaner. The Institute has been registered under Section 80-G of Income Tax Act. The building of the Institute has been constructed by the Acharya Tulsi Shanti Pratisthan, Bikaner and was donated for its use. The staff and doctors are arranged by the Govt. of Rajasthan. Various equipments have been procured from the aid of Central Government for better treatment of cancer patients.

See also 
 Acharya Tulsi

References 

Research institutes in Rajasthan
Regional Cancer Centres in India
Health in Rajasthan
Hospitals in Rajasthan
Bikaner
Year of establishment missing